Engineering plastics are a group of plastic materials that have better mechanical and/or thermal properties than the more widely used commodity plastics (such as polystyrene, PVC, polypropylene and polyethylene). 

Being more expensive than standard plastics, engineering plastics are produced in lower quantities and tend to be used for smaller objects or low-volume applications (such as mechanical parts), rather than for bulk and high-volume ends (like containers and packaging). Engineering plastics have a higher heat resistance than standard plastics and are continuously usable at temperatures up to about 150 °C.

The term usually refers to thermoplastic materials rather than thermosetting ones. Examples of engineering plastics include polyamides (PA, nylons), used for skis and ski boots; polycarbonates (PC), used in motorcycle helmets and optical discs; and poly(methyl methacrylate) (PMMA, major brand names acrylic glass and plexiglass), used e.g. for taillights and protective shields. The currently most-consumed engineering plastic is acrylonitrile butadiene styrene (ABS), used for e.g. car bumpers, dashboard trim and Lego.

Engineering plastics have gradually replaced traditional engineering materials such as metal, glass or ceramics in many applications. Besides equalling or surpassing them in weight/strength and other properties, engineering plastics are much easier to manufacture, especially in complicated shapes. Across all different product types, more than 22 million tonnes of engineering plastics were consumed worldwide in 2020.

Relevant properties 
Each engineering plastic usually has a unique combination of properties that may make it the material of choice for some application. For example, polycarbonates are highly resistant to impact, while polyamides are highly resistant to abrasion. Other properties exhibited by various grades of engineering plastics include heat resistance, mechanical strength, rigidity, chemical stability, self lubrication (specially used in manufacturing of gears & skids) and fire safety.

Examples 
 Acrylonitrile butadiene styrene (ABS)
 Nylon 6
 Nylon 6-6
 Polyamides (PA)
 Polybutylene terephthalate (PBT)
 Polycarbonates (PC)
 Polyetherimide (PEI) ULTEM
 Polyetheretherketone (PEEK)
 Polyetherketoneketone (PEKK) 
 Polyetherketones (PEK)
 Polyketone (PK)
 Polyethylene terephthalate (PET)
 Polyimides
 Polyoxymethylene plastic (POM / Acetal)
 Polyphenylene sulfide (PPS)
 Polyphenylene oxide (PPO)
 Polysulphone (PSU)
 Polytetrafluoroethylene (PTFE / Teflon)
 Poly(methyl methacrylate) (PMMA)

See also
High-performance plastics

References

 
Plastics